Millerosauria is an order of Parareptiles that contains the families †Millerettidae and †Eunotosauridae. It is the sister group to the order Procolophonomorpha. It was named in 1957 by Watson. It was once considered a suborder of the disused group Captorhinida and was called Millerosauroidea. All members of this order are thought to be extinct. Eunotosaurus has been recovered as a stem-turtle in recent cladistic studies.

References

Parareptiles
Prehistoric animal orders
Guadalupian first appearances
Lopingian extinctions